Tyrannodoris ricei is a species  of sea slug, a polycerid nudibranch, a marine gastropod mollusc in the family Polyceridae.

Distribution
This species was described from Florida with additional material from North Carolina.

Description
Tyrannodoris ricei is a predominantly yellow animal with numerous dark blue, almost black spots. The yellow gills and rhinophores are edged with dark blue. It reaches approximately 60 mm in length. Like other nudibranchs in the genus Tyrannodoris, it is carnivorous, feeding on other seaslugs.

References

Polyceridae
Gastropods described in 2008